The list of inductees into the Pro Football Hall of Fame includes players, coaches, and contributors (e.g., owners and team or league officials) who have "made outstanding contributions to professional football". The "charter" class of seventeen was selected in 1963.

As of 2020, 17 inductees have played for, coached, or contributed to the Miami Dolphins. 
Jimmy Johnson was the most recent Dolphin selected.

According to the Pro Football Hall of Fame, 10 of these men made the major part of their primary contribution to the Miami Dolphins. Five more spent a minor portion of their career with the Dolphins, and Bill Parcells held an administrative position after his coaching career.

References 

Hall of Fame
 
+Miami Dolphins